Mordellistena horni is a beetle in the genus Mordellistena of the family Mordellidae. It was described in 1927 by Maurice Pic.

References

horni
Beetles described in 1927